Sagamore Hills can refer to:

 Sagamore Hill, a home of U.S. President Theodore Roosevelt
 Sagamore Hills, a neighborhood of Lansing, Michigan
 Sagamore Hills Township, Summit County, Ohio